Becky Iverson (born October 12, 1967) is an American professional golfer who played on the LPGA Tour. She currently works as the director of golf at The Bridges Golf Club in Madison, Wisconsin

Amateur career
Iverson was born in Escanaba, Michigan. She was 1986 Michigan Junior Amateur champion and 1987 Michigan Women's Amateur champion. She played her collegiate golf at Michigan State University where she was 1987 Academic All-American and 1987-88 Academic All-Big Ten.

Professional career
Iverson played full-time on the Futures Tour from 1989 to 1993 and sparingly since 1994, winning three times. In 1993, she tied for 43rd at the LPGA Final Qualifying Tournament to earn non-exempt status for the 1994 LPGA season. She gained her first LPGA victory in 1995 at the Friendly's Classic.

She was a member of the 2000 United States Solheim Cup team.

Professional wins

LPGA Tour wins (1)

LPGA Tour playoff record (0–1)

Futures Tour wins (3)
1994 (2) Olympia Spa Futures Classic, 13th Annual Salisbury Futures Classic
1997 (1) Betty Puskar Morgantown Futures Classic

Team appearances
Professional
Solheim Cup (representing the United States): 2000

References

External links

American female golfers
Michigan State Spartans women's golfers
LPGA Tour golfers
Solheim Cup competitors for the United States
Golfers from Michigan
People from Escanaba, Michigan
People from Gladstone, Michigan
1967 births
Living people